The 25th Chicago Film Critics Association Awards, honoring the best in film for 2012, were announced on December 17, 2012.

Winners and nominees
The winners and nominees for the 25th Chicago Film Critics Association Awards are as follows:

Awards

Awards breakdown 
The following films received multiple nominations:

The following films received multiple wins:

References

External links
 

 2012
2012 film awards
December 2012 events in the United States